Der verlorene Ball (English: "The Lost Ball") is an East German film. It was released in 1959.

External links
 

1959 films
1959 animated films
German children's films
German animated films
East German films
1950s German-language films
Films with live action and animation
1950s German films